The Upper Thracian Plain (Gornotrakiyska nizina) constitutes the northern part of the historical region of Thrace. It is located in southern Bulgaria, between Sredna Gora mountains to the north and west, a secondary mountain chain parallel to the main Balkan Mountains; the Rhodopes, Sakar and Strandzha to the south; and the Black Sea to the east. The plain is part of Northern Thrace. The climate is transitional continental. The precipitation is  a year. Important rivers are the Maritsa and its tributaries, Arda, Tundzha, Stryama, Topolnitsa, and Vacha. Important cities include Plovdiv, Burgas, Stara Zagora, Pazardzhik, Asenovgrad, Haskovo, Yambol and Sliven.

References

 

Geography of Thrace
Plains of Bulgaria
Landforms of Plovdiv Province
Landforms of Haskovo Province
Landforms of Burgas Province
Landforms of Stara Zagora Province
Landforms of Pazardzhik Province
Landforms of Yambol Province
Landforms of Sliven Province
Northern Thrace